Kyrylo Pospyeyev (born 30 December 1975 in Tambov) is a Ukrainian former professional cyclist.

Palmares

1998
3rd Overall Tour of Yugoslavia
2001
1st  National Road Race Championships
2002
7th Overall Ster Elektrotoer
1st  Mountains Classification
9th GP du canton d'Argovie
2004
2nd Giro dell'Etna
6th Overall Settimana Internazionale Coppi e Bartali
7th Overall Circuit de la Sarthe

Grand Tour general classification results timeline

WD = Withdrew

References

1975 births
Living people
Ukrainian male cyclists
Cyclists at the 2004 Summer Olympics
Olympic cyclists of Ukraine
People from Tambov
21st-century Ukrainian people